The Graduate Aptitude Test in Engineering (GATE) is an examination conducted in India that primarily tests the comprehensive understanding of various undergraduate subjects in engineering and science for admission into the Masters Program and Job in Public Sector Companies. GATE is conducted jointly by the Indian Institute of Science and seven Indian Institutes of Technologies at Roorkee, Delhi, Guwahati, Kanpur, Kharagpur, Chennai (Madras) and Mumbai (Bombay) on behalf of the National Coordination Board – GATE, Department of Higher Education, Ministry of Education (MoE), Government of India.

The GATE score of a candidate reflects the relative performance level of a candidate. The score is used for admissions to various post-graduate education programs (e.g. Master of Engineering, Master of Technology, Master of Architecture, Doctor of Philosophy) in Indian higher education institutes, with financial assistance provided by MHRD and other government agencies. Recently, GATE scores are also being used by several Indian public sector undertakings for recruiting graduate engineers in entry-level positions. It is one of the most competitive examinations in India. GATE is also recognized by various institutes outside India, such as Nanyang Technological University in Singapore.

Financial assistance in post-graduate programs

The GATE is used as a requirement for financial assistance (e.g. scholarships) for a number of programs, though criteria differ by admitting institution.

Eligibility

The following students are eligible to take GATE:

 Bachelor's degree holders in Engineering / Technology / Architecture (3 years after 10+2/ 10+2+3(ongoing)/ 10+2+4(ongoing)/ Post-B.Sc./ Post-Diploma) and those who are in the final year of such programs ( Also prefinal year of B.tech).
 Master's degree holders in any branch of Science/Mathematics/Statistics/Computer Applications or equivalent and those who are in the final year of such programs.
 Candidates in the second or higher year of Four-year integrated master's degree programs (Post-B.Sc.) in Engineering / Technology.
 Candidates in the fourth or higher year of Five-year integrated master's degree programs or Dual Degree programs in Engineering / Technology.
 Candidates with qualifications obtained through examinations conducted by professional societies recognized by UGC/AICTE (e.g. AMIE by IE(India), AMICE by the Institute of Civil Engineers (India)-ICE(I), AMIETE By IETE(India)) as equivalent to B.E./B.Tech.
 A candidate who is currently studying in the 3rd or higher years of any undergraduate degree program OR has already completed any government approved degree program in 
 Engineering / Technology / Architecture / Science / Commerce / Arts is eligible to appear for GATE 2022 examination. Those who have completed section A or equivalent of such professional courses are also eligible.

There is no age limit criterion defined by the exam conducting authority to appear in GATE.

Disciplines, structure, syllabus, and marking scheme

Disciplines 
At present, GATE is conducted in the following 29 disciplines. A candidate can select any one or two of these subjects relevant to his/her discipline.

From 2022, 2 new papers were introduced.

The paper sections under XE* , XL** and XH*** are defined by some dedicated codes which are mentioned in the following table-

Duration and examination type 

The examination is of 3 hours duration, and contains a total of 65 questions worth a maximum of 100 marks. The examination for all the papers is carried out in an online Computer Based Test (CBT) mode where the candidates are shown the questions in a random sequence on a computer screen. The questions consist of some Multiple Choice Questions or MCQs (four answer options out of which only ONE is correct, which has to be chosen). Remaining questions may be of Multiple Select Questions or MSQs (four answer options out of which ONE or MORE than ONE is/are correct, hence correct options need to be chosen) and/or Numerical Answer Type questions or NATs (answer is a real number, to be entered via an on-screen keypad and computer mouse).

Syllabus 

 Verbal Ability: English grammar, sentence completion, verbal analogies, word groups, instructions, critical reasoning and verbal deduction.
 Numerical Ability: Numerical computation, numerical estimation, numerical reasoning and data interpretation.
Engineering Mathematics (not for all Papers)
Technical Ability: Technical questions related to the Paper chosen

Questions and marking scheme 
The examination will consist of totally 65 questions, segregated as One-mark and Two-mark questions. Out of 65 questions, 10 questions will be from General Aptitude (Verbal and Numerical ability) and 55 questions will be Technical, based on the Paper chosen. The General Aptitude section will have 5 One-mark questions and 5 Two-mark questions, accounting for about 15% of total marks. The Technical section and Engineering Mathematics section will combinedly have 25 One-mark questions and 30 Two-mark questions, accounting for about 85% of total marks. Further, all the sections may have some Multiple Choice Questions or MCQs, while remaining questions may be Multiple Select Questions or MSQs and/or Numerical Answer Type questions or NATs. The examination awards negative marks for wrong MCQ answers. Usually, 1/3rd of original marks will be deducted for wrong MCQ answers (i.e. -0.33 for wrong One-mark answers and -0.66 for wrong Two-mark answers) while there are no negative marks for MSQs and NATs. Also there is NO partial credit for MSQs and NATs.

Result and test score

GATE results are usually declared about one month after the examinations are over. The results show the total marks scored by a candidate, the GATE score, the all-India rank (AIR) and the cut off marks for various categories in the candidate's paper. The score is valid for 3 years from the date of announcement of the GATE results. The score cards are issued only to qualified candidates.

Normalized GATE Score (new procedure)

Calculation of "normalized marks" for subjects held in multiple sessions (CE, CS, EC, EE and ME):

From 2014 onward, examination for CE, CS, EC, ME and EE subjects is being held in multiple sessions. Hence, for these subjects, a suitable normalization is applied to take into account any variation in the difficulty levels of the question sets across different sessions. The normalization is done based on the fundamental assumption that "in all multi-session GATE papers, the distribution of abilities of candidates is the same across all the sessions". According to the GATE committee, this assumption is justified since "the number of candidates appearing in multi-session subjects in GATE 2014 is large and the procedure of allocation of session to candidates is random. Further it is also ensured that for the same multi-session subject, the number of candidates allotted in each session is of the same order of magnitude."

Based on the above, and considering various normalization methods, the committee arrived at the following formula for calculating the normalized marks, for CE, CS, EC, EE and ME subjects:

Normalized mark (ij) of jth candidate in ith session, is given by

 where,

 Mij is the actual marks obtained by the jth candidate in the ith session,
 gt is the average marks of the top 0.1 % candidates in all sessions of that subject,
 Mgq is the sum of mean and standard deviation of marks of all candidates in all sessions of that subject,
 ti is the average of marks of top 0.1 % candidates in the ith session of that subject,
 Miq is the sum of mean and standard deviation of marks of all candidates in the ith session of that subject.

After evaluation of the answers, normalized marks based on the above formula will be calculated using the raw (actual) marks obtained by a candidate in the CE, CS, EC, EE or ME subject. The "score" will be calculated using these normalized marks. For all other subjects (whose tests are conducted in a single session), the actual marks obtained by the candidates will be used in calculating the score.

Calculation of GATE Score for all subjects (single-session and multiple-session):

From GATE 2014 onward (and year 2014-15 of the 2-year validity period of GATE 2013 score), a candidate's GATE score is computed by the following new formula. 
 
where,
 S = Score (normalized) of a candidate,
 M = Marks obtained by a candidate ("normalized marks" in case of multiple-session subjects CE, CS, EC, EE and ME),
 Mq = Qualifying marks for general category candidates in that subject (usually 25 or μ + σ, whichever is higher),
 μ = Average (i.e. arithmetic mean) of marks of all candidates in that subject,
 σ = Standard deviation of marks of all candidates in that subject,
 t = Average marks of top 0.1 % candidates (for subjects with 10000 or more appeared candidates) or top 10 candidates (for subjects with less than 10000 appeared candidates),
 St = 900 = Score assigned to t,
 Sq = 350 = Score assigned to Mq.

Percentile:

A candidate's percentile denotes the percentage of candidates scoring lower than that particular candidate. It is calculated as:

Percentile = ( 1 -  ) x 100%

Old formula

Till GATE 2012 (and year 2013-14 of the 2-year validity period of GATE 2013 score), the score was calculated using the formula:

GATE score = 

where,
 m = Marks obtained by the candidate,
 a = Average of marks of all candidates who appeared in that subject, in that year, with marks less than zero converted to zero,
 S = Standard deviation of marks of all candidates who appeared in that subject, in that year, with marks less than zero converted to zero,
 ag = Global average of marks of all candidates who appeared across all subjects in current and past 5 years (i.e. 2010 to 2013 for GATE 2013), with marks less than zero converted to zero,
 sg = Global standard deviation of marks of all candidates who appeared across all subjects in current and past 5 years (i.e. 2010 to 2013 for GATE 2013), with marks less than zero converted to zero.

Qualifying marks

The rules for qualifying marks have varied from year to year. The qualifying marks (out of 100) are different for different subjects as well as categories.

Here μ is the average (i.e., arithmetic mean) of marks of all candidates in the subject (with negative marks converted to zero) and σ is the standard deviation of all marks in that subject.

Usually, the general category's qualifying mark is in the 25 to 50 range.

The Government of India implemented reservations for other backward classes in college admissions and public sector job recruitment in the year 2008. Before that, all OBC candidates were included in the "general" category. There was no separate OBC category then.

Statistics

The following line chart shows the number of candidates registered, appeared, and qualified (total of all subjects).

* Precise figures unavailable right now.

The following line chart shows the variation of the number of candidates appeared in the 5 subjects with the largest numbers of appeared candidates, since GATE 2010:

* Precise figures unavailable right now.

Gate Statistics by Years

Difficulty level 

GATE, for long, has been known to test the Engineering basics in a smart way. Complaints of "lengthy" problems have been rare. But the task of mastering an entire course of Engineering (around 30 undergraduate subjects) for a three-hour test, itself gives the test a certain level of toughness. Each year, only around 15% of all appearing candidates qualify. High percentiles (more than 99th percentile, in some cases) are required to get admission in M.Tech. or M.E. degree programs in Indian Institutes of Technology and Indian Institute of Science, or get shortlisted for job interviews in Indian public sector undertakings.

Admission to post-graduate programs

Unlike undergraduate admissions in India, candidates must apply individually to each institute after the institute has published its M.Tech. notification (usually in the month of March). There is no separate counselling held.
For admissions in NITs and IIITs, CCMT is held every year and the notification is released around April of each year.

Some institutions specify GATE qualification as mandatory even for admission of self-financing students to postgraduate programs. GATE qualified candidates are also eligible for the award of Junior Research Fellowship in CSIR Laboratories and CSIR sponsored projects. Top rank holders in some GATE papers are entitled to apply for "Shyama Prasad Mukherjee Fellowship" awarded by CSIR.
Some government organizations prescribe GATE qualification as a requirement for applying to the post of a Scientist/Engineer.

In recent years, various academicians have recognized GATE as being one of the toughest exams in its category. Some non-Indian universities like the National University of Singapore, Nanyang Technological University in Singapore and some technical universities in Germany also identify GATE score as a parameter for judging the quality of the candidates for admission into their Masters and Ph.D. programs.

Some management institutes like NITIE, Mumbai offer admission to Post Graduate Diploma in Industrial Engineering on the basis of GATE score.

Most Indian institutes do not specify cut-off marks for previous years. So there is a general confusion in terms of selecting institutes and specializations. But in the recent years IIT Kharagpur and IIT Guwahati have been specifying last year cut-off mark list. Indian Institute of Technology Delhi has a very detailed website on Post Graduate (PG) activities and admissions where students can find the relevant information on cut-off marks etc. Typically the Indian Institute of Science and Indian Institutes of Technology are the most selective followed by National Institutes of Technology and others. Also there are some state universities in India, whose standards and facilities are very much comparable to top IITs and NITs. Some of them are Jabalpur Engineering College, Jadavpur University, Delhi Technological University, Cochin University of Science and Technology (CUSAT), Andhra University College of Engineering, Osmania University etc. Even within the top institutes, the selection criteria varies widely across departments and programs depending on expertise areas. The Directorate of Technical Education of Maharashtra state has also started conducting CAP round from the year 2013 for GATE and non-GATE candidates in all institutes in Maharashtra that offer M.E./M.Tech. programs.

CSIR's JRF - GATE fellowship

The Council of Scientific and Industrial Research (CSIR) introduced the Junior Research Fellowship (JRF) - GATE scheme in 2002 to allow GATE-qualified engineering graduates and GPAT-qualified pharmaceutical graduates to pursue research through suitable Ph.D. programs at CSIR laboratories.

Stipend and tenure:

The total duration of the fellowship is 5 years, within which the candidate is expected to complete the Ph.D. degree.

COAP 
Common Offer Acceptance Portal (COAP) is an online portal that allows candidates clearing GATE to register and get call letters from various IITs and PSUs for interviews. After the declaration of GATE results, candidates must apply through COAP, as its the only platform from which you can book your seat in post graduate programs in various institutes like the IITs.

Recruitment

Public sector undertakings (PSUs) in India, for long, have had troubles conducting their recruitment processes with more than 100,000 students taking the exams for less than 1000 jobs (a selection rate of less than 1%). After sensing the exponential rise in the number of engineering graduates in India who wish to get a PSU job, the PSUs have decided that a GATE score shall be the primary criteria for initial shortlisting. This change was the primary cause for the rapid increase in applicants for GATE 2012.

Indian Oil Corporation was the first PSU which successfully tested out this system and was followed two years later by National Thermal Power Corporation, Bharat Heavy Electricals, Bharat Electronics & PowerGrid Corporation of India.

Usually these companies release their recruitment notifications right after GATE notification, indicating that candidates have to take GATE to be considered for a job in their organizations.

List of companies

Many companies have signed Memorandums of Understanding (MoUs) with the GATE organizing committee, for using the GATE score as a screening tool for recruiting engineers at entry-level positions.
 Bharat Petroleum Corporation Ltd.
 Hindustan Petroleum Corporation Ltd.
 Indian Oil Corporation Ltd.
 National Hydroelectric Power Corporation Ltd.
 Power Grid Corporation of India Ltd.
 Mazagon Dock Ltd.
 Gujarat State Electricity Corporation Ltd.
 Oil and Natural Gas Corporation
 Central Electronics Ltd. 
 Coal India Ltd. 
 National Thermal Power Corporation Ltd. 
 Punjab State Power Corporation Ltd. 
 THDC Ltd. 
 Odisha Power Generation Corporation   
 Ircon International Ltd. 
 Bharat Broadband Network Limited
 National Highways Authority of India
 Airport Authority of India    
 Delhi Metro Rail Corporation  
 Bihar State Power Holding Company Limited  
 West Bengal State Electricity Distribution Company

The syllabus for the GATE exam and its preparation remains the same, irrespective of whether one is applying for a job at a PSU or seeking admission for post-graduation in engineering.

Changes in recent years